Barak Levi (or Levy, ; born 7 January 1993) is an Israeli goalkeeper who plays for Hapoel Nof HaGalil.

Early life
Levi was born in Rishon LeZion, Israel to a Jewish family.

Club career
Levi grew up in the Maccabi Tel Aviv youth academy. He made his debut with the senior team on 23 April 2011.  Levi started in Maccabi's Europa League clash against Stoke City on 3 November 2011, conceding two goals in a 2–1 defeat.

Honours
Maccabi Tel Aviv
Israeli Premier League (3): 2012–13, 2013–14, 2014–15
 Israel State Cup (1): 2014-2015 
Toto Cup (1): 2014–15

External links

References

1993 births
Israeli Jews
Living people
Israeli footballers
Maccabi Tel Aviv F.C. players
Maccabi Netanya F.C. players
Hapoel Katamon Jerusalem F.C. players
Hapoel Petah Tikva F.C. players
Bnei Yehuda Tel Aviv F.C. players
Hapoel Ra'anana A.F.C. players
Hapoel Nof HaGalil F.C. players
Israeli Premier League players
Liga Leumit players
Footballers from Rishon LeZion
Israel under-21 international footballers
Association football goalkeepers